The 1981–82 Saint Joseph's Hawks men's basketball team represented Saint Joseph's University as a member of the East Coast Conference during the 1981–82 NCAA Division I men's basketball season. Led by first-year head coach Jim Boyle, the Hawks finished with an overall record of 25–8 (9–2 in ECC play). Saint Joseph's won the ECC tournament, and received an automatic bid to the NCAA tournament as No. 6 seed in the East region. The team was defeated by No. 11 seed Northeastern in the opening round.

Roster

Schedule and results

|-
!colspan=9 style=| Regular season

|-
!colspan=9 style=| ECC Tournament

|-
!colspan=9 style=| NCAA Tournament

Rankings

References

Saint Joseph's
Saint Joseph's
Saint Joseph's Hawks men's basketball seasons